Rydlewo  is a village in the administrative district of Gmina Żnin, within Żnin County, Kuyavian-Pomeranian Voivodeship, in north-central Poland.
Gilda Gray (Marianna Michalska), Polish-American dancer and actress, place of birth.

References

Rydlewo